National Airlines Flight 102 was a cargo flight operated by National Airlines between Camp Bastion in Afghanistan and Al Maktoum Airport in Dubai, with a refueling stop at Bagram Airfield, Afghanistan. On 29 April 2013, the Boeing 747-400 operating the flight crashed moments after taking off from Bagram, killing all seven people on board.

The subsequent investigation concluded that improperly secured cargo broke free during the take-off and rolled to the back of the cargo hold, crashing through the rear pressure bulkhead and disabling the rear flight control systems. This rendered the aircraft uncontrollable, making recovery from a stall, brought on by the damaged rear flight control systems ending up stuck in a pitch-up attitude, impossible.

Accident
 
At the time of the crash, the airline had been operating between Camp Bastion and Dubai for a month. The accident flight had originated in Camp Bastion, where it had been loaded with five heavy armoured vehicles, and had stopped at Bagram Airfield to refuel. The aircraft then took off from Bagram's runway 03 at 15:30 local time and was climbing through  when its nose rose sharply. The aircraft then stalled, banked right, and leveled off just before impact with the ground; the whole aircraft exploded into a large fireball, almost damaging the vehicles nearby. The crash site was off the end of runway 03, within the perimeter of the airfield. All seven crew, all of whom were U.S. citizens, died: four pilots, two mechanics, and a loadmaster. No one on the ground was injured.

A thunderstorm was also in the vicinity of Bagram at the time of the crash and the wind changed direction by 120° during one hour commencing approximately 35 minutes before the crash. A dashboard camera on a car in the vicinity of the runway end recorded the crash, which shows the aircraft pitching up, falling into a stall, and then sharply banking right after a slight bank to the left, indicating asymmetrical lift. The plane soon righted itself and then crashed at a shallow angle on the ground. CNN stated that a government official speaking on the condition of anonymity confirmed the video's authenticity.

Aircraft
The aircraft involved was a 20-year-old Boeing 747-428BCF, registration  S/N 25630, and named Lori. It was manufactured in 1993 as a combi aircraft, and delivered to Air France and later modified for service as a freighter with Air France, before being sold to National Airlines. At the time of the crash, the aircraft was flying on behalf of the United States Air Force's Air Mobility Command.

Crew 
The captain was 34-year-old Brad Hasler, who had worked for the airline since 2004. He had 6,000 flight hours, including 440 hours on the Boeing 747.

The first officer was 33-year-old Jamie Lee Brokaw, who had worked for the airline since 2009 and had 1,100 flight hours, with 209 of them on the Boeing 747.

The relief captain was 37-year old Jeremy Lipka, and the relief first officer was 32-year-old Rinku Shumman.

The loadmaster was 36-year-old Michael Sheets, who had worked for the airline since 2010.

The two mechanics were Gary Stockdale and Tim Garrett, both 51 years old.

Aftermath
The crash interrupted the New Zealand Defence Force's (NZDF) withdrawal from Afghanistan, as it was only hours away from using another National Airlines aircraft to fly equipment out of the country; after the crash, the NZDF indefinitely postponed using National Airlines for its airlift requirements.

The aircraft name Lori was transferred to another National Airlines 747 eight years later, which was registered as N936CA and former Global SuperTanker Services aircraft.

“Lori” was named after the companies  owners “Chris Alf”’s wife, Lori Alf.

Investigation

The United States National Transportation Safety Board (NTSB) and the Afghanistan Civil Aviation Authority investigated the crash. The NTSB reported in a 30 April 2013 press release that representatives of the Federal Aviation Administration and the Boeing Company would also provide technical expertise and aid in the investigation.

On 2 June 2013, investigators from the Ministry of Transport and Civil Aviation of Afghanistan confirmed the load shift hypothesis as the starting point: the cargo of five mine resistant ambush protected vehicles (three Cougars and two Oshkosh M-ATV's), totaling 80 tons of weight, had not been properly secured. At least one armored vehicle had come loose and rolled backward, crashing through the airplane's rear bulkhead, damaging it. In the process it crippled key hydraulic systems and severely damaged the horizontal stabilizer components – most notably breaking its jackscrew, which rendered the airplane uncontrollable. Control of the aircraft was therefore lost, with the abnormal pitch-up rotation, stall, and crash to the ground ensuing. The damage made it impossible for the crew to regain control of the aircraft.

The NTSB determined that the probable cause of this accident was "National Airlines' inadequate procedures for restraining special cargo loads, which resulted in the loadmaster's improper restraint of the cargo." One of the key recommendations was to mandate training for all loadmasters.

In media
The Canadian TV series Mayday (also known as Air Disasters and Air Emergency in the US and Air Crash Investigation in the UK and the rest of the world) covered Flight 102 in episode 10 of season 16, called "Afghan Nightmare", first broadcast in 2017.

See also
Boeing 747 hull losses
MK Airlines Flight 1602
Emery Worldwide Airlines Flight 17

Notes

References

External links
National Transportation Safety Board
NTSB preliminary report
NTSB Final Aircraft Accident Report
NTSB investigation docket
"Information Related to Flight NCR102." National Air Cargo (Archive)
"STATEMENT FROM NATIONAL AIR CARGO." EVA International Media. 2 May 2013. (Archive)

Accidents and incidents involving the Boeing 747
Accidents and incidents involving cargo aircraft
Aviation accidents and incidents in 2013
Aviation accidents and incidents in Afghanistan
2013 in Afghanistan
April 2013 events in Afghanistan
102
Airliner accidents and incidents caused by stalls